Ramdas Singh  is an Indian politician. He was a Member of Parliament, representing Giridih in the Lok Sabha the lower house of India's Parliament as a member of the Bharatiya Janata Party.

References

External links
Official biographical sketch in Parliament of India website

Lok Sabha members from Bihar
Bharatiya Janata Party politicians from Jharkhand
Janata Party politicians
India MPs 1977–1979
India MPs 1989–1991
Possibly living people